Travis Donald Braden (born March 25, 1994) is an American professional stock car racing driver. He most recently competed full-time in the ARCA Menards Series, driving the No. 27 Ford for RFMS Racing. He has also raced super late models, winning the Winchester 400 in 2016 and the Snowball Derby in 2019.

Racing career

Braden began racing when he was eight years old, competing in mini-wedges, quarter-midgets and Legends car racing, winning a Young Lions national points championship. He later won the Whelen All-American Series state championship in Ohio.

He raced super late models in 2013 and 2014, winning the ARCA/CRA Super Series championship both of those years.

Braden made his ARCA Menards Series debut in 2015, and won his first start in the series, passing William Byron near the end of the race at Lucas Oil Raceway.

In 2016, Braden went super late model racing, winning the Winchester 400 in Winchester, Indiana.

After running part-time for RFMS Racing in the 2017 ARCA Racing Series, the team and Braden agreed to a full-time slate in 2018. Braden returned to RFMS for a second full season in 2019, and early in the year, led the championship point standings, which he would finish fourth in at the end of the season.

In 2019, Braden entered the Snowball Derby for the first time. He qualified 30th, the last car in on time trials, after qualifying with a rebuilt car after being wrecked by another competitor in practice. He was declared the winner of the race after original winner Stephen Nasse's car failed post-race technical inspection.

In early 2020, Braden revealed that he would not contest another season in the ARCA Menards Series, instead using the year to move to Charlotte, North Carolina and focus on large super late model races and races in NASCAR's top three divisions.

Personal life
Braden is a native of Wheeling, West Virginia, and attended West Virginia University where he double-majored in aerospace and mechanical engineering. Braden is a 2012 graduate of Wheeling Park High School.

Motorsports career results

ARCA Menards Series
(key) (Bold – Pole position awarded by qualifying time. Italics – Pole position earned by points standings or practice time. * – Most laps led.)

References

External links
 
 

Living people
1994 births
ARCA Menards Series drivers
ARCA Midwest Tour drivers
Racing drivers from West Virginia
Sportspeople from Wheeling, West Virginia
West Virginia University alumni